Anthony Terlazzo (July 28, 1911 – March 26, 1966) was an Italian-born American weightlifter. He was America's first weightlifter to win an Olympic gold medal, which he had done in 1936. He also won a bronze medal at the 1932 Games. While winning the 1936 gold medal Terlazzo set Olympic records in the total, at 312.5 kg (687.5 lbs), and in the snatch, at 97.5 kg (214.5 lbs).

Terlazzo won two world (1937–38) and 12 national titles, which remains the highest number for any American weightlifter. Between 1935 and 1938 he set five ratified world records: three in the press and two in the clean and jerk.

References

1911 births
1966 deaths
American male weightlifters
Olympic gold medalists for the United States in weightlifting
Olympic bronze medalists for the United States in weightlifting
People associated with physical culture
Weightlifters at the 1932 Summer Olympics
Weightlifters at the 1936 Summer Olympics
Medalists at the 1936 Summer Olympics
Medalists at the 1932 Summer Olympics
Italian emigrants to the United States
20th-century American people